Yoshihiro Sakata  (坂田好弘) is a rugby union official and former player who gained sixteen full international caps with the Japan national rugby union team 1967–1973. He played as wing for Kintetsu and Canterbury RFU and was nicknamed Demi Sakata. He was the first Japanese player to be inducted into the International Rugby Board Hall of Fame.

Early life
Sakata was born 26 September 1942 in Kyoto, Japan. He practiced judo before taking up rugby.

Club rugby
He played as wing for Kintetsu. He moved to New Zealand in 1969 to be a student at the University of Canterbury and was the first Japanese player to play for their rugby team. He played provincial rugby for Canterbury RFU and scored 30 tries in 27 appearances. He had introduced himself as "Deme" (relating to big eyes) but people instead called him "Demi" (meaning small or half-sized).

International career
He first played for Japan on 12 March 1967 against New Zealand students at Osaka. In June 1968, he scored four tries in the 23–19 victory against the Junior All Blacks.

He was selected for the 1973 Japan rugby union tour of Wales, England and France. On 6 October 1973 he played against a Welsh XV at Cardiff Arms Park, the first representative match between the nations. The final match of the tour was against France at Bordeaux on 27 October 1973, this was his last cap.

Coaching
After retiring from playing rugby, Sakata has held coaching and administrative roles in the sport.

Honours
In 2012, Sakata was the 51st player to be inducted into the International Rugby Board Hall of Fame, the first from Japan. A ceremony was held at Mizuho Rugby Stadium in Nagoya. In the 2021 New Year Honours, Sakata was appointed an honorary Member of the New Zealand Order of Merit, for services to New Zealand–Japan relations and rugby.

References

Living people
1942 births
Sportspeople from Kyoto
Rugby union wings
Japan international rugby union players
World Rugby Hall of Fame inductees
Canterbury rugby union players
Hanazono Kintetsu Liners players
Honorary Members of the New Zealand Order of Merit
University of Canterbury alumni